Tokyopop, originally named MixxZine, was a manga anthology published in North America by Tokyopop.

History
MixxZine at the start published five manga series, two of which were shōjo (geared towards young or teenaged girls) and two of which were seinen (geared towards adolescent boys/men):
Harlem Beat
Ice Blade
Magic Knight Rayearth
Parasyte
Sailor Moon

Sailor Moon was taken out of the anthology and moved to Smile, as the seinen and shōjo content were hard to reconcile due to the vast difference in audiences, and as Mixx wanted to refocus the magazine towards high school and university/college-aged readers which focused more on shōjo titles.

When MixxZine was renamed Tokyopop in July 1999, the focus changed towards more information on Asian culture, along with manga and articles on J-pop, video games, and anime. The magazine was offered for free, and only a few manga titles were published in the magazine, rotating through the following titles:
 Magic Knight Rayearth 
 Mobile Suit Gundam: Blue Destiny
 Parasyte
 Sorcerer Hunters
Tokyopop was eventually discontinued in August 2000.

See also 

 List of manga magazines published outside of Japan

References

Anime and manga magazines
Magazines disestablished in 2000
Magazines established in 1999
Defunct magazines published in the United States
Magazines published in California
1999 establishments in California